Johann Adalbert Angermayer (1674–1742) was a painter born in Bílina, Habsburg monarchy. He specialized in cabinet still life compositions. Since 1699, he studied painting in Prague under Johann Rudolf Byss and is recorded there as a member the Old Town Painter Guild between 1707 and 1727. He was known to paint counterparts to older solitary still life paintings, as was fashionable at the time. Some of his students include John Caspar Hirschely and Carl Kastner.

Biography

He was born on 9 November 1674 in Bílina. Since 1699, he lived in Prague, where he studied under Johann Rudolf Byss, who came to Prague seven years earlier. Johann Adalbert joined the Old Town Painter Guild in 1707. He built a reputation for his patiently detailed paintings of still life, often quite small in size. Among his pupils belong the early Roccoco painter John Caspar Hirschely and Carl Kastner. Other than his work stay at the Monastery of Osek (1719–1722), Johann Adalbert Angermayer spent most of his life in Prague, where he died on 10 May 1742.

Topics and style

Angermayer painted flowers, fabrics, hunting trophies and quiet scenes from nature as was customary, but also nontraditional compositions like his Still Life with a Watch or Still Life with a Jewelry Box (1708). He was greatly influenced by the Leiden Fijnschilders, as was his teacher Johann Rudolf Byss, who studied in Netherlands. Angermayer was known for his skill of realistic portrayal of details. Most of his work can be classified as cabinet still life, because the width or height of his paintings rarely exceeds 35 cm.

References

External links
Johann Adalbert Angermayer on Artnet

1674 births
1742 deaths
Czech painters
Czech male painters
German painters
German male painters
People from Bílina
German still life painters
Czech still life painters
German Bohemian people